State Route 198 (SR 198) is a primary state highway in the Middle Peninsula region of the U.S. state of Virginia. It runs from the U.S. Route 17 and State Route 33 split at Glenns east via Cobbs Creek and Mathews to State Routes 642 and 653 near Moon.

Route description

State Route 198 begins at the intersection of U.S. Route 17 (US 17) and SR 33 at Glenns in Gloucester County.  US 17 is a north–south highway while SR 33 comes from the west and joins US 17 heading to the north.  From the intersection, SR 198 heads to the southeast along Glenns Road, a narrow two-lane undivided road lined with trees and dotted with houses.  Four miles (6.4 km) to the east, SR 198 turns east onto Dutton Road.  Turning west takes traffic back to US 17 along Pampa Road, which is designated SR 601.

Heading east along Dutton Road, SR 198 continues through an area of farmland before turning south to cross a slough which connects to the adjacent Piankatank River.  It turns to the southeast and intersects Harcum Road, which is designated SR 606.  East of Harcum Road, the route enters Mathews County.

One half-mile (0.4 km) into Mathews County, SR 198 intersects Windsor Road, which carries SR 3 from the south. From SR 3, SR 198 travels in a semi-circular route through the communities of Cobbs Creek and Blakes. East of Blakes, the highway turns to the southeast towards Hudgins, where SR 198 meets the western end of SR 223.

One mile (1.6 km) south of Hudgins, SR 14 joins SR 198 from the west.  The two routes head south for  until Mathews, where SR 14 splits away to the south.  SR 198 heads east out of Mathews along Buckley Hill Road.  One mile east of Mathews, at an intersection with SR 653, the SR 198 designation ends.  SR 642 begins at this point and continues along Buckley Hill Road towards Moon.

Major intersections

References

External links

Virginia Highways Project: VA 198

198
State Route 198
State Route 198